The Scotland national under-20 rugby union team participates in the World Rugby Under 20 Championship.  Their highest placement is 5th which they achieved in the 2017 World Rugby Under 20 Championship.

The U20 side also compete in the Six Nations Under 20s Championship.

Both tournaments began in 2008 and replaced the Under 19 or Under 21 championships. The World Rugby Under 20 Championship was known as the IRB Junior World Championship up to 2014.

Prior to this, there were U19 and U21 tournaments for the World Rugby Championship. There was also a U21 tournament for the Six Nations from 2004.

The Under 20 side is now the pinnacle of Scottish Rugby's age-grade system.

Previous squads

2021

2020

2019

2018

2017

2016

2015

2014

2013

2012

2011

2010

2009

2008

References

External links
 

European national under-20 rugby union teams
Rugby union